Zhwandoon  TV ( - means"Life") is a Pashto-language television station based in Kabul, Afghanistan .<ref
name=undefined></ref>

Satellite details
Zwandoon TV Satellite details: AsiaSat 3S, frequency 3683 MHz, symbol rate 2074ksps, FEC 3/4 Vertical polarisation. If you have the signal for Khyber TV  than only change the frequency and symbols rate.

See also
 List of television channels in Afghanistan

References 

http://www.pajhwok.com/en/2013/09/09/massoud%E2%80%99s-supporters-ransack-tv-station

Television channels and stations established in 2011
Television stations in Afghanistan
Pashto mass media
Pashto-language television stations
Mass media in Kabul